The Suzhou Olympic Sports Centre is a sports complex located in the Suzhou Industrial Park, Jiangsu, China. The complex is composed of multiple buildings and stadiums including a stadium, a gymnasium, a natatorium and a business center. The stadium is named Suzhou Olympic Sports Centre Stadium. It was officially opened in January 2019. This sports hub includes commercial center, gymnasium, aquatics center, arena and more. It also has a sports garden which features pedestrian walkways, sport fields and greenery.

Construction
Initially called the Suzhou Industrial Park Sports Center, the construction site east of Jinji Lake was located within the Suzhou Industrial Park. The plan was for a 60 hectare facility to host a stadium, an indoor arena, an aquatics center and a commercial hub. The main stadium's architectural design is inspired from the traditional Chinese lantern design. The main indoor arena was planned to have a seating capacity of 13,000. The sports center was scheduled to be opened to the public in 2018. In February 2018, it was renamed as Suzhou Olympic Sports Center and open to public in June 30.

References

Sports venues in Suzhou
Football venues in China
Athletics (track and field) venues in China
Multi-purpose stadiums in China
Sports venues completed in 2018
Gerkan, Marg and Partners buildings